The chenal de l'Île d'Orléans (English: Orléans Island Channel) is a channel of the St. Lawrence River, flowing in the administrative region of Capitale-Nationale, in the province of Quebec, in Canada.

This channel is formed by the Île d'Orléans which is bound to the southeast by the St. Lawrence River and to the northeast by the channel of Île d'Orléans.

The surface of the Île d'Orléans channel is generally frozen from mid-December to the end of March.

The main access roads are route 138 which runs along the north shore of the St. Lawrence River and Chemin Royal which runs along the northwest shore of Île d'Orléans.

Geography 
The Île d'Orléans channel begins opposite the crossroads where the Dufferin-Montmorency Expressway and the Félix-Leclerc Expressway meet, on the northwest shore of the St. Lawrence River. Opposite, the municipality of Sainte-Pétronille administers the southwestern tip of Île d'Orléans.

The width of the entrance to the channel measures .

The course of the Île d'Orléans channel passes under the Île d'Orléans bridge.

The mouth of the Île d'Orléans channel, which merges with the St. Lawrence River, is located at Pointe aux Prêtres (north-west bank of the river) and Pointe Argentenay (end north of Île d'Orléans). The center of this confluence is located at:
  North-east of the mouth of the Sainte-Anne River (Beaupré);
  northwest of the southeast shore of the St. Lawrence River;
  North-east of the bridge connecting the Île d'Orléans to L'Ange-Gardien;
  Southeast of downtown Quebec (city).

History 
The toponym "Chenal de l'Île d'Orléans" was formalized on December 5, 1968 at the Commission de toponymie du Québec, that is when it was created.

Notes and references

See also 

 Capitale-Nationale
 La Côte-de-Beaupré Regional County Municipality
 Île d'Orléans
 St. Lawrence River
 List of Quebec channels
 List of rivers of Quebec

Rivers of Capitale-Nationale
La Côte-de-Beaupré Regional County Municipality